

Events
Frank Lyons is convicted of the murder of police officer John Hurley.

Arts and literature

Births
Joseph C. Amberg, New York (Brooklyn) gangster 
Alphonse "The Peacemaker" Attardi, New York mobster and government informant 
Antonio "The Scourge" Lombardo, Unione Siciliane leader and Chicago Outfit consigliere 
William "Wild Bill" Lovett, White Hand Gang leader 
Dean O'Banion, Chicago North Side Gang leader

Deaths

References

Organized crime
Years in organized crime